= Pablo Murcia =

Argentina-born English virologist

Pablo Murcia is professor of integrative virology at the University of Glasgow. He started working at the University of Glasgow at 2011, and in 2020, being a senior lecturer, was promoted to a professor.
